Ellabella is a genus of moths in the family Copromorphidae.

Species
Ellabella bayensis Heppner, 1984
Ellabella chalazombra (Meyrick, 1938)
Ellabella editha Busck, 1925
Ellabella johnstoni Heppner, 1984
Ellabella melanoclista Meyrick, 1927 (originally in Probolacma)

References

 , 1984: On the taxonomic position of Ellabella Busck, with descriptions of the larva and pupa of E. bayensis (Lepidoptera: Copromorphidae). Journal of Research on the Lepidoptera 23 (1): 74-82. Full article: .
 , 1984: Revision of the Oriental and Nearctic genus Ellabella (Lepidoptera: Copromorphidae). Journal of Research on the Lepidoptera 23 (1): 50-73. Full article: .

External links
Natural History Museum Lepidoptera generic names catalog

Copromorphidae